Robert Reid Dower (4 June 1876 – 15 September 1964) was a Cape Colony cricketer who played in one Test match in 1899. He was also a lawyer. He and his wife Gertrude had four sons and a daughter.

References

External links

1876 births
1964 deaths
Eastern Province cricketers
Cricketers from Cape Colony
People from Kokstad